Al-Dhahra Sporting Club is a Libyan football club based in Tripoli, Libya. The club is playing the Libyan Second Division for this season.

Achievements
Libyan Premier League: 1
 1985/86

Performance in CAF competitions
 African Cup of Champions Clubs: 1 appearance
1986: First Round

Dhahra